1998–99 Croatian First A League was the eighth season of the Croatian handball league since its independence.

League table

Sources 
 Fredi Kramer, Dražen Pinević: Hrvatski rukomet = Croatian handball, Zagreb, 2009.; page. 179
 Petar Orgulić: 50 godina rukometa u Rijeci, Rijeka, 2005; pages 258, 259, 260

References

External links
Croatian Handball Federation
European Handball Federation
Croatian Handball Champions
History

1998-99
handball
handball
Croatia